Saad Ichalalène (born March 27, 1987 in Saint-Denis, France) is a French-Algerian football coach. He is a former professional football player.

Player career

PSG Youth Academy
Ichalalène joined the youth academy of Paris Saint-Germain at the age of 12. He progressed through the junior ranks of Paris Saint Germain and was the captain of its reserve team when they were crowned French U-18 champions in 2006.

Ichalalène joined the youth academy of Paris Saint Germain at the age of 12 and stayed until the age of 20. As a youth player, Ichalalène went through all PSG youth categories and played 71 matches with the PSG B team. He was captain of the PSG B team and the U-18 team who was crowned France champion in 2006.

Nîmes Olympique
On November 11, 2007, he signed with National side Nîmes Olympique. During his first six months with the club, he made 17 appearances and Nîmes finished third in the league to win promotion back to Ligue 2. The following two seasons, due to a recurring injury, he played for only 12 games and left the club at the end of the 2009–10 Ligue 2 season.

USM Alger
In January 2011, Ichalalène signed an 18-month contract with USM Algiers. Still unable to recover from his injury, he only played four games for the club before deciding to end his professional career at 24 years old.

International Career 
Ichalalène represented Algeria twice at the U-20 level.

Coaching career

Paris Saint Germain FC Youth Academy

In 2012, Saad Ichalalene was appointed head coach of the Paris Saint Germain Youth Academy. He stayed in the role for four years before departing in 2016.

Malaysia - National Football Development Program

Ichalalène was appointed by the National Football Development Program (NFDP) in Malaysia to head its training methodology and talent identification from 2016 to 2018.

In January 2019, he was appointed concurrently as the coach and technical director. During his time in Malaysia, the NFDP Programme provided players for the national youth teams, which successfully qualified for two Asian Football Confederation youth tournaments and won the 2019 AFF U-15 Championship and the 2019 AFF U-19 Youth Championship.

After six years, Ichalalène left the National Football Development Programme in January 2023.

References

External links
 
 

1987 births
Living people
French sportspeople of Algerian descent
Algerian footballers
Paris Saint-Germain F.C. players
Nîmes Olympique players
Ligue 2 players
Sportspeople from Saint-Denis, Seine-Saint-Denis
USM Alger players
Algeria youth international footballers
Association football defenders
Footballers from Seine-Saint-Denis